Frank H. Johnson (December 13, 1867 - ?) was a member of the Wisconsin State Assembly.

Biography
Johnson was born on December 13, 1867 in what is now Madison County, Montana. In 1875, he settled in Darien (town), Wisconsin.

Career
Johnson was elected to the Assembly in 1904. He was a Republican.

References

People from Madison County, Montana
People from Darien, Wisconsin
Republican Party members of the Wisconsin State Assembly
1867 births
Year of death missing